Phyllonorycter anceps is a moth of the family Gracillariidae. It is found in Sardinia, Italy and Crete.

The larvae feed on Malus, Mespilus, Prunus dulcis and Pyrus communis. They mine the leaves of their host plant. They create a lower-surface tentiform mine which is 10–12 mm long in Almond and about 15 mm long in Pear. The lower epidermis contains two to three length folds.

External links
bladmineerders.nl
Fauna Europaea

anceps
Moths of Europe
Moths described in 2007